Boston Metro or Metro Boston may refer to:

 Boston Metro, the subway system of the Massachusetts Bay Transportation Authority, locally known as "The MBTA" or "The T".
 Metro Boston, the Boston edition of the Metro International newspaper.
 Greater Boston, the metropolitan area surrounding and including Boston.